Lycium brevipes is a species of flowering plant in the nightshade family known by the common name Baja desert-thorn. It is native to northwestern Mexico and it occurs in California as far as the Sonoran Desert as well as some of the Channel Islands. It grows in the scrub of desert and coastline. It is also used as a southwestern landscaping plant. The lavender to nearly white corolla is funnel-shaped and has 2 to 6 lobes at the mouth. The five stamens and one style protrude from the flower. The fruit is a bright red spherical berry about a centimeter wide containing many seeds. The berries attract birds.

References

External links
Jepson Manual Treatment

brevipes